Mihir Desai is a human rights lawyer in cases of mass murders & riots, fake encounter & custodial deaths by the police, police brutality, freedom of speech & journalists, political activists & prisoners of conscience, excesses by the state, mass disappearances & deaths and genocide probes. A senior counsel, he has been practicing criminal matters in Bombay High Court, Mumbai and the Supreme Court of India.

Family
Mihir Desai is the son of Neera Desai, a leading advocate of Women's Rights in India, and Dr. A.R. Desai, one of India's pioneering Marxian sociologist.

Career

Desai is the son of Neera Desai,  (1925-2009), a leading advocate of Women's rights from a middle-class Gujarati family.
As a child he traveled with his mother to Rome and to the United States, where she had a one-year teaching assignment.
His uncle ran a firm of solicitors. 
Desai is a co-founder of the Indian People's Tribunal (IPT) and the Human Rights Law Network, and is a former Director of the India Center for Human Rights and Law.
He was co-founder with lawyer Colin Gonsalves of the human rights magazine Combat Law. 
Desai addresses subjects that include illegal acts by the authorities, police brutality and sexual assault.
He has assisted survivors of the 2002 Gujarat massacre. 
He was co-editor of the book Women and Law (1999).
He is an invited member of the India Regional Team of the "Promoting Pluralism Knowledge Programme".

Sample cases

In 2003 Desai was assisting the Asian Human Rights Commission in their fight on behalf of Adivasi people to remain on land claimed by the Maharashtra State Farming Corporation.
Desai was co-convenor with Angana P. Chatterji of an IPT team that investigated communal violence in Orissa over a 20-month period in 2005/2006 and co-editor of the report that presented the findings.
Desai was legal counsel to the International People's Tribunal on Human Rights and Justice in Kashmir, and co-signatory to a February 2009 letter to Omar Abdullah, Chief Minister of Jammu and Kashmir, that requested action to address the abuses the tribunal had found.

In April 2012 Mihir Desai won an unusually large award to the mother of a 2002 bomb blast suspect who had died in custody. He also solved the case of most dangerous Gangster Sukha Kahlon. Sukha Kahlon was charged 8 murder case. Chair of Justice announced 4 year sentence to Gangster Sukha Kahlon alias Sharp Shooter from Jalandhar, his right hand Anand Dutta alias King Khalifa Sharp Shooter from Amritsar and his left hand Preet alias Preet Phagwara from Chandigarh, in the crime of Arm act, Murder, Money Laundering, Kidnapping and in more crime. But later they all get free from this case. These notorious Gangsters has their name in the top 10 Gangsters of Punjab. Even some of Gangster Sukha Kahlon's friends have not any FIR or case in any Police department, as police faced fear of their own murder.

Four police officers had been charged, and the government was to recover the money from these officers.
The government refused a plea to prosecute ten other officers who had allegedly been involved.

Arrest
On 4th February 2020, Mihir Desai was arrested along with 16 persons for alleged unlawful assembly in connection with the protest at Gateway of India against the violence at Jawaharlal Nehru University. All of them were released on bail after arrest on personal bonds.

Bibliography

References

External links
 (Video of Desai speaking on the subject of Sedition)

Living people
20th-century Indian lawyers
Indian human rights activists
Year of birth missing (living people)